The 2019 Miami Open (sponsored by Itaú) was a professional men and women's tennis tournament played on outdoor hard courts that started on March 18, 2019, and ended on March 31, 2019.  It was the 35th edition of the Miami Open, and part of the Masters 1000 category on the 2019 ATP Tour, and of the Premier Mandatory category on the 2019 WTA Tour. This was the first time the tournament took place at the Hard Rock Stadium in Miami Gardens, Florida, United States.

Points and prize money

Point distribution

* Players with byes receive first round points.

Prize money

ATP singles main-draw entrants

Seeds
The following are the seeded players. Rankings and seedings are based on ATP rankings as of March 18, 2019.

† The player did not qualify for the tournament in 2018. Accordingly, points for his 18th best result are deducted instead.

Withdrawals
The following players would have been seeded, but they withdrew from the event. 

† The player is entitled to use an exemption to skip the tournament and substitute his 18th best result (45 points in each case) in its stead.
‡ The player did not qualify for the main draw based on his ranking at the entry cutoff date and only withdrew from the alternates list. Accordingly, no points are deducted for the withdrawal.

Other entrants
The following players received wildcards into the singles main draw:
  Christopher Eubanks
  David Ferrer
  Miomir Kecmanović
  Nicola Kuhn
  Tseng Chun-hsin

The following player received entry using a protected ranking into the singles main draw:
  Janko Tipsarević

The following players received entry from the qualifying draw:
  Radu Albot 
  Félix Auger-Aliassime
  Alexander Bublik 
  Pablo Cuevas
  Prajnesh Gunneswaran
  Lukáš Lacko
  Thiago Monteiro
  Reilly Opelka 
  Andrey Rublev
  Casper Ruud
  Lorenzo Sonego
  Mikael Ymer

The following players received entry as lucky losers:
  Dan Evans
  Lloyd Harris
  Mackenzie McDonald

Withdrawals
Before the tournament
  Tomáš Berdych → replaced by  Dan Evans
  Pablo Carreño Busta → replaced by  Ernests Gulbis
  Chung Hyeon → replaced by  Mackenzie McDonald
  Alex de Minaur → replaced by  Jaume Munar
  Juan Martín del Potro → replaced by  Janko Tipsarević
  Richard Gasquet → replaced by  Ilya Ivashka
  Philipp Kohlschreiber → replaced by  Bernard Tomic
  Gaël Monfils → replaced by  Lloyd Harris
  Rafael Nadal  → replaced by  Ugo Humbert
  Yoshihito Nishioka → replaced by  Thomas Fabbiano
  Andreas Seppi → replaced by  Pablo Andújar
  Fernando Verdasco → replaced by  Bradley Klahn

During the tournament
  Damir Džumhur
  Maximilian Marterer

Retirements
  Matthew Ebden
  Nicola Kuhn

ATP doubles main-draw entrants

Seeds

1 Rankings as of March 18, 2019.

Other entrants
The following pairs received wildcards into the doubles main draw:
  Marcelo Demoliner /  Miomir Kecmanović
  Taylor Fritz /  Nick Kyrgios
  Mackenzie McDonald /  Reilly Opelka

WTA singles main-draw entrants

Seeds
The following are the seeded players. Seedings are based on WTA rankings as of March 4, 2019. Rankings and points before are as of March 18, 2019.

Withdrawals
The following players would have been seeded, but they withdrew from the event.

Other entrants
The following players received wildcards into the singles main draw:
  Olga Danilović
  Cori Gauff
  Caty McNally
  Mari Osaka
  Whitney Osuigwe
  Natalia Vikhlyantseva
  Wang Xinyu
  Wang Xiyu

The following player received entry using a protected ranking into the singles main draw:
  Anna-Lena Friedsam

The following players received entry from the qualifying draw:
  Misaki Doi
  Viktorija Golubic
  Nao Hibino 
  Dalila Jakupović
  Kaia Kanepi 
  Karolína Muchová 
  Monica Niculescu 
  Jessica Pegula 
  Laura Siegemund 
  Taylor Townsend 
  Sachia Vickery 
  Yanina Wickmayer

The following players received entry as lucky losers:
  Polona Hercog
  Kristýna Plíšková

Withdrawals
Before the tournament
  Ekaterina Makarova → replaced by  Sara Sorribes Tormo
  Maria Sharapova (right shoulder injury) → replaced by  Margarita Gasparyan
  Lesia Tsurenko → replaced by  Polona Hercog
  Alison Van Uytvanck → replaced by  Kristýna Plíšková

During the tournament
  Serena Williams (left knee injury)

Retirements
  Bianca Andreescu (right shoulder injury)

WTA doubles main-draw entrants

Seeds 

1 Rankings as of March 4, 2019.

Other entrants
The following pairs received wildcards into the doubles main draw:
  Amanda Anisimova /  Alison Riske
  Victoria Azarenka /  Ashleigh Barty
  Lauren Davis /  Christina McHale

Champions

Men's singles

  Roger Federer def.  John Isner, 6–1, 6-4

Women's singles

  Ashleigh Barty def.  Karolína Plíšková, 7–6(7–1), 6–3

Men's doubles

  Bob Bryan /  Mike Bryan def.  Wesley Koolhof /  Stefanos Tsitsipas, 7–5, 7–6(10–8)

Women's doubles

  Elise Mertens /  Aryna Sabalenka def.  Samantha Stosur /  Zhang Shuai, 7–6(7–5), 6–2

References

External links
 

 
2019
2019 ATP Tour
2019 WTA Tour
2019 in American tennis
2019 in sports in Florida
2019
March 2019 sports events in the United States